Clathromangelia fenestrata is an extinct species of sea snail, a marine gastropod mollusk in the family Raphitomidae.

Description

Distribution
Fossils of this extinct species were found in Pliocene strata in northwest France.

References

 Millet de la Turtaudière P.A. (1865). Indicateur de Maine-et-Loire ou Indicateur par communes de ce que chacune d'elle renferme sous le rapport de la géographie, des productions naturelles, des monuments historiques, de l'industrie et du commerce. Tome 2, 616 pp. Angers: Cosnier et Lachèse. page(s): 589
 Ceulemans L., Van Dingenen F. & Landau B.M. (2018). The lower Pliocene gastropods of Le Pigeon Blanc (Loire- Atlantique, northwest France). Part 5 – Neogastropoda (Conoidea) and Heterobranchia (fine). Cainozoic Research. 18(2): 89-176 page(s): 106, pl. 3 figs 10-12

External links
 

fenestrata
Gastropods described in 1865